Discogobio multilineatus is a fish species in the genus Discogobio endemic to a branch of the Hongshui River in China.

References

External links 

Cyprinid fish of Asia
Fish described in 1993
Discogobio